was a town located in Hiraka District, Akita Prefecture, Japan.

In 2003, the town had an estimated population of 8,733 and a density of 117.68 persons per km². The total area was 74.21 km².

On October 1, 2005, Masuda, along with the towns of Hiraka, Jūmonji, Omonogawa and Ōmori; and the villages of Sannai and Taiyū (all from Hiraka District), was merged into the expanded city of Yokote.

Notable people
Tōshirō Ishida

External links
 Yokote official website 

Dissolved municipalities of Akita Prefecture
Yokote, Akita